John Callas is an American film and television writer, director, and producer best known for Bobby's World, Lone Wolf, and No Solicitors.

Early life and education 
Callas received a Master's degree in directing from Occidental College in Los Angeles, CA.

Career 

Callas worked in a variety of film production positions beginning in 1977, including for the films Young Lady Chatterley and The Happy Hooker Goes To Hollywood. In 1983, he served as first assistant director and unit production manager on Wes Craven's The Hills Have Eyes Part II. In 1988, Callas made his directorial debut with the feature film Lone Wolf. In 1993, he was brought on to the design team for the Dennis the Menace trailer, to assemble a production team and handle live effects, for a nuanced visual effects sequence.

In 2015, he wrote, produced, and directed the horror film No Solicitors. The film starred Eric Roberts, Beverly Randolph, Kim Poirier, Jason Maxim, and Felissa Rose. It screened at multiple festivals in 2015, and was released on VOD and DVD in 2018.

Callas also authored the novels Secrets, Christmas Voices, and No Solicitors, based on the film of the same name.

Filmography

Film

Television

Awards and nominations 

|-
| 1991
| Bobby's World
| Daytime Emmy Award for Outstanding Animated Program
| 
|-
|}

References

External links 

 

Year of birth missing (living people)
Living people
American film directors
American screenwriters
American film producers
Horror film directors
Occidental College alumni